Aguinaldo Luiz Sorato (born 8 April 1969), known as Sorato, is a Brazilian former professional footballer who played as a striker. He spent seven years of his professional career with Vasco da Gama; they won the 1998 Copa Libertadores.

Honours
Vasco da Gama
 Copa Libertadores: 1998
 Campeonato Brasileiro Série A: 1989, 1997
 Campeonato Carioca: 1988, 1992, 1998

Palmeiras
 Campeonato Brasileiro Série A: 1993
 Campeonato Paulista: 1993, 1994
 Torneio Rio-São Paulo: 1993

Botafogo
 Campeonato Carioca: 1997

Paulista
 Campeonato Brasileiro Série C: 2001
 Campeonato Paulista Série A2: 2001

Vitória
 Campeonato Baiano: 2007

Individual
 Campeonato Brasileiro Série C Top scorer: 2006

References

1969 births
Living people
Brazilian footballers
Campeonato Brasileiro Série A players
CR Vasco da Gama players
Association football forwards
Bangu Atlético Clube players
Esporte Clube Bahia players
Cruzeiro Esporte Clube players
Sociedade Esportiva Palmeiras players
Botafogo de Futebol e Regatas players
Esporte Clube Vitória players
Fluminense FC players
Madureira Esporte Clube players
Paulista Futebol Clube players
Sociedade Esportiva do Gama players